Tiantongyuanbei station is a station on and the northern terminus of Line 5 of the Beijing Subway.

The station has 2 elevated side platforms.

Exits 
There are 4 exits, lettered A, B, C, and D. Exit C is accessible.

References

External links
 

Beijing Subway stations in Changping District
Railway stations in China opened in 2007